The English Open was a table tennis tournament in England, last staged by the International Table Tennis Federation (ITTF) in Sheffield in 2011.

History

The tournament was first held as the English Open in 1927 by the English Table Tennis Association. Apart from a wartime break in the early 1940s, the tournament was held every year until 1980, and then every two years until the early 1990s.

In 1996, the ITTF decided to include that year's English Open in Kettering as the very first event of the first ever ITTF Pro Tour. The tournament went on to feature in the ITTF Pro Tour five more times, in 1997, 1999, 2001, 2009 and in 2011, when it was held for the last time.

The record for the most men's singles tournament wins is held by Richard Bergmann, who won six titles between 1939 and 1954, including two while representing Austria and four while representing England. Maria Alexandru of Romania holds the record for the most women's singles tournaments wins, having won six titles between 1963 and 1974.

Champions

English National Championships, 1921-1926

From 1921 to 1926 the tournament was called the English National Championships and was organised by the Table Tennis Association.

English Open Championships, 1927-1995

In April 1927 the Table Tennis Association was dissolved and re-formed as the English Table Tennis Association. The first English Open Championships were held that year.

Senior events

Veteran events

Team events

Men's and women's team events were held as part of the English Open from 1963 to 1992.

ITTF Pro Tour English Open, 1996-2011

The ITTF Pro Tour included the English Open in its schedule on six occasions from 1996 to 2011.

See also
English National Table Tennis Championships
Table Tennis England

References

External links
International Table Tennis Federation
Table Tennis England

Table tennis competitions
Table tennis competitions in the United Kingdom